Midland Christian School is a private Christian K–12 school in Midland, Texas, associated with the Churches of Christ. The school is a member of the National Christian School Association; it is governed by a board of directors and is one of the largest Christian schools in the United States.

History
The school opened in 1957 with 30 students in kindergarten and first grade in a building behind the founders' church in downtown Midland. It moved to three buildings on its current campus in 1963, and after the gradual addition of grades, graduated its first high school class in 1981. In 2020–21, enrollment was 1,197; it has been above 1,200, the second largest school of its kind in the country. Ground was broken in 2011 for a construction project including new junior high and high school buildings.

In January 2022, a student reported a sexual assault in a locker room as part of freshman hazing. Five administrators—the superintendent, the principal and vice principal of the secondary school, the athletic director, and the head baseball coach—were subsequently arrested and charged with failure to report with intent to conceal neglect or abuse.

Activities
Midland Christian's athletics teams are the Mustangs; it has programs in baseball, basketball, cheerleading, cross country, football, golf, softball, tennis, track and field, and volleyball. The football team lost to Dallas Parish Episcopal School in the final of the 2021 TAPPS Division 1 Championship.

References

External links
Official website

Education in Midland, Texas
1957 establishments in Texas
Educational institutions established in 1957
Christian schools in Texas